Paramesiodes is a genus of moths belonging to the subfamily Tortricinae of the family Tortricidae. The genus was erected by Alexey Diakonoff in 1960.

Species
Paramesiodes albescens (Meyrick, 1912)
Paramesiodes aprepta Bradley, 1965
Paramesiodes chloradelpha (Meyrick, 1912)
Paramesiodes geraeas (Meyrick, 1909)
Paramesiodes longirostris Diakonoff, 1960
Paramesiodes minor Diakonoff, 1960
Paramesiodes temulenta (Meyrick, 1912)

See also
List of Tortricidae genera

References

 Diakonoff, A. (1960). Verhandelingen der Koninklijke Nederlandse Akademie van Wetenschappen. (2) 53 (2): 127.
 Brown, John W. (2005). World Catalogue of Insects. 5.

External links
Tortricid.net

Archipini
Tortricidae genera